

Events

Pre-1600
AD 23 – Rebels sack the Chinese capital Chang'an during a peasant rebellion. 
1209 – Otto IV is crowned Emperor of the Holy Roman Empire by Pope Innocent III.
1302 – The Byzantine–Venetian War comes to an end.
1363 – Battle of Lake Poyang: In one of the largest naval battles in history, Zhu Yuanzhang's rebels defeat rival Chen Youliang.
1511 – Formation of the Holy League of Aragon, the Papal States and Venice against France.
1535 – The Coverdale Bible is printed, with translations into English by William Tyndale and Myles Coverdale.
1582 – The Gregorian Calendar is introduced by Pope Gregory XIII.
1597 – Governor Gonzalo Méndez de Canço begins to suppress a native uprising against his rule in what is now the state of Georgia.

1601–1900
1602 – Eighty Years' War and the Anglo-Spanish War: A fleet of Spanish galleys are defeated by English and Dutch galleons in the English Channel.
1636 – Thirty Years' War: The Swedish Army defeats the armies of Saxony and the Holy Roman Empire at the Battle of Wittstock.
1693 – Nine Years' War: Piedmontese troops are defeated by the French.
1777 – American Revolutionary War: Troops under George Washington are repelled by British troops under William Howe.
1795 – Napoleon first rises to prominence by suppressing counter-revolutionary rioters threatening the National Convention.
1824 – Mexico adopts a new constitution and becomes a federal republic.
1830 – The Belgian Revolution takes legal form when the provisional government secedes from the Netherlands.
1853 – The Crimean War begins when the Ottoman Empire declares war on the Russian Empire.
1876 – The Agricultural and Mechanical College of Texas opens as the first public college in Texas.
1883 – First run of the Orient Express.
  1883   – First meeting of the Boys' Brigade in Glasgow, Scotland.
1895 – Horace Rawlins wins the first U.S. Open Men's Golf Championship.

1901–present
1917 – World War I: The Battle of Broodseinde is fought between the British and German armies in Flanders.
1918 – World War I: An explosion kills more than 100 people and destroys a Shell Loading Plant in New Jersey.
1920 – The Mannerheim League for Child Welfare, a Finnish non-governmental organization, is founded on the initiative of Sophie Mannerheim.
1925 – Great Syrian Revolt: Rebels led by Fawzi al-Qawuqji captured Hama from the French Mandate of Syria.
  1925   – S2, a Finnish Sokol class torpedo boat, sinks during a fierce storm near the coast of Pori in the Gulf of Bothnia, taking with it the whole crew of 53.
1927 – Gutzon Borglum begins sculpting Mount Rushmore.
1936 – The Metropolitan Police and various anti-fascist organizations violently clash in the Battle of Cable Street.
1941 – Norman Rockwell's Willie Gillis character debuts on the cover of The Saturday Evening Post.
1957 – Sputnik 1 becomes the first artificial satellite to orbit the Earth.
1958 – The current constitution of France is adopted.
1960 – An airliner crashes on takeoff from Boston's Logan International Airport, killing 62 people.
1963 – Hurricane Flora kills 6,000 in Cuba and Haiti.
1965 – Pope Paul VI begins the first papal visit to the Americas.
1966 – Basutoland becomes independent from the United Kingdom and is renamed Lesotho.
1967 – Omar Ali Saifuddien III of Brunei abdicates in favour of his son.
1985 – The Free Software Foundation is founded.
1991 – The Protocol on Environmental Protection to the Antarctic Treaty is opened for signature.
1992 – The Rome General Peace Accords end a 16-year civil war in Mozambique.
  1992   – El Al Flight 1862 crashes into two apartment buildings in Amsterdam, killing 43 including 39 on the ground.
1993 – Battle of Mogadishu occurs killing 18 U.S. Special Forces, two UN Peacekeepers and at least 600 Somalian militia men and civilians. 
  1993   – Tanks bombard the Russian parliament, while demonstrators against President Yeltsin rally outside.
1997 – The second largest cash robbery in U.S. history occurs in North Carolina
2001 – Siberia Airlines Flight 1812 crashes after being struck by an errant Ukrainian missile. Seventy-eight people are killed.
2003 – The Maxim restaurant suicide bombing in Israel kills twenty-one Israelis, both Jews and Arabs.
2004 – SpaceShipOne wins the Ansari X Prize for private spaceflight.
2006 – WikiLeaks is launched.
2010 – The Ajka plant accident in Hungary releases a million cubic metres of liquid alumina sludge, killing nine, injuring 122, and severely contaminating two major rivers.
2017 – Joint Nigerien-American Special Forces are ambushed by Islamic State militants outside the village of Tongo Tongo.
2021 – Bubba Wallace becomes the first African-American Driver in the modern era of NASCAR to win a major race
2022 – Alain Aspect, John F. Clauser and Anton Zeilinger are jointly awarded the Nobel Prize in Physics.

Births

Pre-1600
1160 – Alys, Countess of the Vexin, daughter of Louis VII of France (d. c. 1220)
1274 – Rudolf I, Duke of Bavaria (d. 1319)
1276 – Margaret of Brabant (d. 1311)
1289 – Louis X of France (d. 1316)
1331 – James Butler, 2nd Earl of Ormond, Irish politician, Lord Justice of Ireland (d. 1382)
1379 – Henry III of Castile (d. 1406)
1507 – Francis Bigod, English noble (d. 1537)
1515 – Lucas Cranach the Younger, German painter (d. 1586)
1522 – Gabriele Paleotti, Catholic cardinal (d. 1597)
1524 – Francisco Vallés, Spanish physician (d. 1592)
1532 – Francisco de Toledo, Catholic cardinal (d. 1596)
1542 – Robert Bellarmine, Italian cardinal and saint (d. 1621)
1550 – Charles IX of Sweden (d. 1611)
1562 – Christen Sørensen Longomontanus, Danish astronomer and author (d. 1647)
1570 – Péter Pázmány, Hungarian cardinal and philosopher (d. 1637)
1579 – Guido Bentivoglio, Italian cardinal (d. 1644)
1585 – Anna of Tyrol, Holy Roman Empress (d. 1618)

1601–1900
1625 – Jacqueline Pascal, French nun and composer (d. 1661)
1626 – Richard Cromwell, English academic and politician, Lord Protector of Great Britain (d. 1712)
1633 – Bernardino Ramazzini, Italian physician (d. 1714)
1657 – Francesco Solimena, Italian painter and illustrator (d. 1747)
1694 – Lord George Murray, Scottish Jacobite General (d. 1760)
1720 – Giovanni Battista Piranesi, Italian sculptor and illustrator (d. 1778)
1723 – Nikolaus Poda von Neuhaus, German entomologist and author (d. 1798)
1759 – Louis François Antoine Arbogast, French mathematician and academic (d. 1803)
1768 – Francisco José de Caldas, Colombian naturalist, executed by royalists in the war of independence (d. 1816)
1787 – François Guizot, French historian and politician, 22nd Prime Minister of France (d. 1874)
1793 – Charles Pearson, English lawyer and politician (d. 1862)
1807 – Louis-Hippolyte Lafontaine, Canadian lawyer and politician, 2nd Premier of Canada East (d. 1864)
1814 – Jean-François Millet, French painter and educator (d. 1875)
1822 – Rutherford B. Hayes, American general, lawyer, and politician, 19th President of the United States (d. 1893)
1835 – Jenny Twitchell Kempton, American opera singer and educator (d. 1921)
1836 – Juliette Adam, French author (d. 1936)
1837 – Auguste-Réal Angers, Canadian judge and politician, 6th Lieutenant Governor of Quebec (d. 1919)
1841 – Prudente de Morais, Brazilian lawyer and politician, 3rd President of Brazil (d. 1912)
  1841   – Maria Sophie of Bavaria (d. 1925)
1843 – Marie-Alphonsine Danil Ghattas, Palestinian nun and Catholic Saint (d. 1927)
1858 – Léon Serpollet, French businessman (d. 1903)
1861 – Walter Rauschenbusch, American pastor and theologian (d. 1918)
  1861   – Frederic Remington, American painter, sculptor, and illustrator (d. 1909)
1862 – Edward Stratemeyer, American author and publisher (d. 1930)
1868 – Marcelo Torcuato de Alvear, Argentinian lawyer and politician, 20th President of Argentina (d. 1942)
1874 – John Ellis, English executioner (d. 1932)
1876 – Florence Eliza Allen, American mathematician and suffrage activist (d. 1960)
1877 – Razor Smith, English cricketer (d. 1946)
1879 – Robert Edwards, American artist, musician, and writer (d. 1948)
1880 – Damon Runyon, American newspaperman and short story writer. (d. 1946)
1881 – Walther von Brauchitsch, German field marshal (d. 1948)
1884 – Ramchandra Shukla, Indian historian and author (d. 1941)
1888 – Lucy Tayiah Eads, American tribal chief (d. 1961)
  1888   – Oscar Mathisen, Norwegian speed skater (d. 1954)
1890 – Alan L. Hart, American physician and author (d. 1962)
  1890   – Osman Cemal Kaygılı, Turkish writer and journalist (d. 1945)
1892 – Engelbert Dollfuss, Austrian soldier and politician, 14th Federal Chancellor of Austria (d. 1934)
  1892   – Hermann Glauert, English aerodynamicist and author (d. 1934)
  1892   – Robert Lawson, American author and illustrator (d. 1957)
1895 – Buster Keaton, American film actor, director, and producer (d. 1966)
  1895   – Richard Sorge, German journalist and spy (d. 1944)
1896 – Dorothy Lawrence, English reporter, who secretly posed as a man to become a soldier during World War I (d. 1964)
1900 – August Mälk, Estonian author and playwright (d. 1987)

1901–present
1903 – Bona Arsenault, Canadian genealogist, historian, and politician (d. 1993)
  1903   – John Vincent Atanasoff, American physicist and academic, invented the Atanasoff–Berry computer (d. 1995)
  1903   – Pierre Garbay, French general (d. 1980)
  1903   – Ernst Kaltenbrunner, Austrian-German lawyer and general (d. 1946)
1906 – Mary Celine Fasenmyer, American mathematician (d. 1996)
1907 – Alain Daniélou, French-Swiss historian and academic (d. 1994)
1910 – Frankie Crosetti, American baseball player and coach (d. 2002)
  1910   – Cahit Sıtkı Tarancı, Turkish poet and author (d. 1956)
1911 – Mary Two-Axe Earley, Canadian indigenous women's rights activist (d. 1996)
1913 – Martial Célestin, Haitian lawyer and politician, 1st Prime Minister of Haiti (d. 2011)
1914 – Jim Cairns, Australian economist and politician, 4th Deputy Prime Minister of Australia (d. 2003)
  1914   – Brendan Gill, American journalist and essayist  (d. 1997)
1916 – Vitaly Ginzburg, Russian physicist and academic, Nobel Prize laureate (d. 2009)
  1916   – Jan Murray, American comedian, actor, and game show host (d. 2006)
  1916   – George Sidney, American director and producer (d. 2002)
  1916   – Ken Wood, inventor of the Kenwood Chef food mixer (d. 1997)
1917 – Violeta Parra, Chilean singer-songwriter and guitarist (d. 1967)
1918 – Kenichi Fukui, Japanese chemist and academic, Nobel Prize laureate (d. 1998)
1921 – Stella Pevsner, American children's author (d. 2020)
1922 – Malcolm Baldrige Jr., American businessman and politician, 26th United States Secretary of Commerce (d. 1987)
  1922   – Shin Kyuk-ho, South Korean-Japanese businessman, founded Lotte Group (d. 2020)
  1922   – Don Lenhardt, American baseball player and coach (d. 2014)
1923 – Charlton Heston, American actor, director and gun rights activist (d. 2008)
1924 – Donald J. Sobol, American soldier and author (d. 2012)
1925 – Roger Wood, Belgian-American journalist (d. 2012)
1926 – Raymond Watson, American businessman (d. 2012)
1927 – Wolf Kahn, American painter and academic (d. 2020)
1928 – Alvin Toffler, German-American journalist and author (d. 2016)
  1928   – Torben Ulrich, Danish-American tennis player
1929 – Scotty Beckett, American actor and singer (d. 1968)
  1929   – John E. Mack, American psychiatrist and author (d. 2004)
  1929   – Leroy Van Dyke, American singer-songwriter and guitarist
1931 – Terence Conran, English designer and businessman (d. 2020)
  1931   – Basil D'Oliveira, South African-English cricketer and footballer (d. 2011)
  1931   – Richard Rorty, American philosopher and author (d. 2007)
1933 – German Moreno, Filipino television host and actor (d. 2016)
  1933   – Ann Thwaite, English author
1934 – Sam Huff, American football player, coach, and sportscaster (d. 2021)
1936 – Charlie Hurley, Irish footballer and manager
  1936   – Giles Radice, Baron Radice, English politician (d. 2022)
1937 – Jackie Collins, English-American author and actress (d. 2015)
  1937   – David Crocker, American philosopher and academic
  1937   – Gail Gilmore, Canadian-American actress and dancer (d. 2014)
  1937   – Lloyd Green, American steel guitar player
  1937   – Jim Sillars, Scottish lawyer and politician
1938 – Kurt Wüthrich, Swiss chemist and biophysicist, Nobel Prize laureate
  1938   – Norman D. Wilson, American actor (d. 2004)
1939 – Ivan Mauger, New Zealand speedway rider (d. 2018)
1940 – Vic Hadfield, Canadian ice hockey player
  1940   – Silvio Marzolini, Argentinian footballer and manager (d. 2020)
  1940   – Steve Swallow, American bass player and composer
  1940   – Alberto Vilar, American businessman and philanthropist
1941 – Roy Blount Jr., American humorist and journalist 
  1941   – Karen Cushman, American author
  1941   – Karl Oppitzhauser, Austrian race car driver
  1941   – Frank Stagg, Irish Hunger Striker (d. 1976)
  1941   – Robert Wilson, American director and playwright
1942 – Bernice Johnson Reagon, American singer-songwriter 
  1942   – Karl W. Richter, American lieutenant and pilot (d. 1967)
  1942   – Jóhanna Sigurðardóttir, Icelandic politician, 24th Prime Minister of Iceland
  1942   – Christopher Stone, American actor and screenwriter (d. 1995)
1943 – H. Rap Brown, American activist
  1943   – Owen Davidson, Australian tennis player
  1943   – Karl-Gustav Kaisla, Finnish ice hockey player and referee (d. 2012)
  1943   – Dietmar Mürdter, German footballer 
  1943   – Jimy Williams, American baseball player and manager
1944 – Colin Bundy, South African-English historian and academic
  1944   – Rocío Dúrcal, Spanish singer and actress (d. 2006)
  1944   – Tony La Russa, American baseball player and manager
  1944   – John McFall, Baron McFall of Alcluith, Scottish educator and politician
1945 – Clifton Davis, American singer-songwriter, actor, and minister
1946 – Larry Clapp, American lawyer and politician (d. 2013)
  1946   – Chuck Hagel, American sergeant and politician, 24th United States Secretary of Defense
  1946   – Michael Mullen, American admiral
  1946   – Susan Sarandon, American actress and activist
1947 – Julien Clerc, French singer-songwriter and pianist
  1947   – Jim Fielder, American bass player 
  1947   – Ann Widdecombe, English politician, Shadow Secretary of State for Health
1948 – Iain Hewitson, New Zealand-Australian chef, restaurateur, author, and television personality
  1948   – Linda McMahon, American businesswoman and politician
  1948   – Duke Robillard, American singer-songwriter and guitarist 
1949 – Armand Assante, American actor and producer
  1949   – Stephen Gyllenhaal, American director, producer, and screenwriter
1951 – Bakhytzhan Kanapyanov, Kazakh poet and author
1952 – Anita DeFrantz, American rower and sports administrator
  1952   – Jody Stephens, American rock drummer
  1952   – Zinha Vaz, Bissau-Guinean women's rights activist and politician
1953 – Gil Moore, Canadian singer-songwriter, drummer, and producer 
  1953   – Andreas Vollenweider, Swiss harp player
1955 – John Rutherford, Scottish rugby player
  1955   – Jorge Valdano, Argentinian footballer, coach, and manager
1956 – Lesley Glaister, English author and playwright
  1956   – Charlie Leibrandt, American baseball player
  1956   – Sherri Turner, American golfer
  1956   – Christoph Waltz, Austrian-German actor
1957 – Bill Fagerbakke, American actor 
  1957   – Yngve Moe, Norwegian bass player and songwriter (d. 2013)
  1957   – Russell Simmons, American businessman, founded Def Jam Recordings and Phat Farm
1958 – Barbara Kooyman, American singer-songwriter and guitarist
  1958   – Anneka Rice, Welsh radio and television host
1959 – Chris Lowe, English singer and keyboard player 
  1959   – Tony Meo, English snooker player
  1959   – Hitonari Tsuji, Japanese author, composer, and director
1960 – Joe Boever, American baseball player
  1960   – Henry Worsley, English colonel and explorer (d. 2016)
1961 – Philippe Russo, French singer-songwriter and guitarist
  1961   – Kazuki Takahashi, Japanese author and illustrator, created Yu-Gi-Oh! (d. 2022)
  1961   – Jon Secada, Cuban-American singer-songwriter
1962 – Carlos Carsolio, Mexican mountaineer
1963 – A. C. Green, American basketball player
  1963   – Koji Ishikawa, Japanese author and illustrator
1964 – Francis Magalona, Filipino rapper, producer, and actor (d. 2009)
  1964   – Yvonne Murray, Scottish runner
1965 – Olaf Backasch, German footballer
  1965   – Skip Heller, American singer-songwriter, guitarist, and producer
  1965   – Steve Olin, American baseball player (d. 1993)
  1965   – Micky Ward, American boxer
1967 – Nick Green, Australian rower
  1967   – Liev Schreiber, American actor and director
1968 – Richard Hancox, English footballer and manager
  1968   – Tim Wise, American activist and author
1971 – Darren Middleton, Australian singer-songwriter and guitarist 
1972 – Kurt Thomas, American basketball player
1974 – Paco León, Spanish actor, director, producer, and screenwriter
1975 – Cristiano Lucarelli, Italian footballer and manager
1976 – Mauro Camoranesi, Argentinian-Italian footballer and manager
  1976   – Elisandro Naressi Roos, Brazilian footballer
  1976   – Alicia Silverstone, American actress, producer, and author
  1976   – Ueli Steck, Swiss mountaineer and rock climber (d. 2017)
1977 – Richard Reed Parry, Canadian guitarist, songwriter, and producer 
1978 – Phillip Glasser, American actor and producer
  1978   – Kei Horie, Japanese actor, director, producer, and screenwriter
  1978   – Kyle Lohse, American baseball player
1979 – Rachael Leigh Cook, American actress
  1979   – Björn Phau, German tennis player
  1979   – Adam Voges, Australian cricketer
1980 – Sarah Fisher, American race car driver
  1980   – James Jones, American basketball player
  1980   – Tomáš Rosický, Czech footballer
1981 – Shaura, Japanese singer 
  1981   – Justin Williams, Canadian ice hockey player
1982 – Tony Gwynn Jr., American baseball player
  1982   – Jered Weaver, American baseball player
1983 – Dan Clarke, English race car driver
  1983   – Marios Nicolaou, Cypriot footballer
  1983   – Chansi Stuckey, American football player
  1983   – Kurt Suzuki, American baseball player
  1983   – Vicky Krieps, Luxembourgish actress
1984 – Lena Katina, Russian singer-songwriter 
  1984   – Álvaro Parente, Portuguese race car driver
  1984   – Karolina Tymińska, Polish heptathlete
1985 – Shontelle, Barbadian singer-songwriter
  1985   – Thorsten Wiedemann, German rugby player
1987 – Rawez Lawan, Swedish footballer
  1987   – Will Puddy, English footballer
  1987   – Marina Weisband, German politician
1988 – Melissa Benoist, American actress and singer
  1988   – Caner Erkin, Turkish footballer
  1988   – Evgeni Krasnopolski, Israeli figure skater
  1988   – Derrick Rose, American basketball player
1989 – Dakota Johnson, American actress
1990 – Signy Aarna, Estonian footballer
  1990   – Saki, Japanese guitarist and songwriter
  1990   – Sergey Shubenkov, Russian hurdler
1993 – Mitchell Swepson, Australian cricketer
1995 – Mikolas Josef, Czech Republic singer and songwriter
1997 – Choi Yu-na, South Korean singer
1997   – Rishabh Pant, Indian cricketer

Deaths

Pre-1600
 744 – Yazid III, Umayyad caliph (b. 701)
 863 – Turpio, Frankish nobleman
1052 – Vladimir of Novgorod (b. 1020)
1160 – Constance of Castile, Queen of France (b. 1141)
1189 – Gerard de Ridefort, Grand Master of the Knights Templar
1221 – William IV Talvas, Count of Ponthieu (b. 1179)
1227 – Caliph al-Adil of Morocco
1250 – Herman VI, Margrave of Baden (b. 1226)
1305 – Emperor Kameyama of Japan (b. 1249)
1361 – John de Mowbray, 3rd Baron Mowbray, English baron (b. 1310)
1497 – John, Prince of Asturias, only son of Ferdinand II of Aragon and Isabella I of Castile (b. 1478)
1582 – Teresa of Ávila, Spanish nun and saint (b. 1515)
1597 – Sarsa Dengel, Ethiopian emperor (b. 1550)

1601–1900
1646 – Thomas Howard, 21st Earl of Arundel, English courtier and politician, Earl Marshal of the United Kingdom (b. 1586)
1660 – Francesco Albani, Italian painter (b. 1578)
1661 – Jacqueline Pascal, French nun and composer (b. 1625)
1669 – Rembrandt, Dutch painter and illustrator (b. 1606)
1680 – Pierre-Paul Riquet, French engineer, designed the Canal du Midi (b. 1609)
1743 – John Campbell, 2nd Duke of Argyll, Scottish commander and politician, Lord Lieutenant of Surrey (b. 1678)
1747 – Amaro Pargo, Spanish corsair (b. 1678)
1749 – Baron Franz von der Trenck, Austrian soldier (b. 1711)
1821 – John Rennie the Elder, Scottish engineer, designed the Waterloo Bridge (b. 1761)
1827 – Grigorios Zalykis, Greek-French lexicographer and scholar (b. 1785)
1851 – Manuel Godoy, Spanish general and politician, Prime Minister of Spain (b. 1767)
1852 – James Whitcomb, American lawyer and politician, 8th Governor of Indiana (b. 1795)
1859 – Karl Baedeker, German publisher, founded Baedeker (b. 1801)
1862 – Johanna van Gogh-Bonger, sister-in-law of Vincent van Gogh, who is credited with promoting his posthumous fame (d. 1925).
1864 – Joseph Montferrand, Canadian logger and strongman (b. 1802)
1867 – Francis Xavier Seelos, German-American priest and missionary (b. 1819)
1871 – Sarel Cilliers, South African spiritual leader and preacher (b. 1801)
1890 – Catherine Booth, English theologian and saint, co-founded The Salvation Army (b. 1829)

1901–present
1903 – Otto Weininger, Austrian philosopher and author (b. 1880)
1904 – Frédéric Auguste Bartholdi, French sculptor, designed the Statue of Liberty (b. 1834)
  1904   – Carl Josef Bayer, Austrian chemist and academic (b. 1847)
1910 – Sergey Muromtsev, Russian lawyer and politician (b. 1850)
1935 – Jean Béraud, French painter and academic (b. 1849)
  1935   – Marie Gutheil-Schoder, German soprano, actress, and director (b. 1874)
1943 – Irena Iłłakowicz, German-Polish lieutenant (b. 1906)
1944 – Al Smith, American lawyer and politician, 42nd Governor of New York (b. 1873)
1946 – Barney Oldfield, American race car driver and actor (b. 1878)
1947 – Max Planck, German physicist and academic, Nobel Prize laureate (b. 1858)
1951 – Henrietta Lacks, American medical patient (b. 1920)
1955 – Alexander Papagos, Greek general and politician, 152nd Prime Minister of Greece (b. 1883)
1958 – Ida Wüst, German actress and screenwriter (b. 1884)
1961 – Benjamin, Russian metropolitan (b. 1880)
1963 – Alar Kotli, Estonian architect (b. 1904)
1970 – Janis Joplin, American singer-songwriter (b. 1943)
1974 – Anne Sexton, American poet and author (b. 1928)
1975 – Joan Whitney Payson, American businesswoman and philanthropist (b. 1903)
1977 – José Ber Gelbard, Argentinian activist and politician (b. 1917)
1980 – Pyotr Masherov, First Secretary of the Communist Party of Byelorussia (b. 1918)
1981 – Freddie Lindstrom, American baseball player and coach (b. 1905)
1982 – Glenn Gould, Canadian pianist and conductor (b. 1932)
  1982   – Stefanos Stefanopoulos, Greek politician, 165th Prime Minister of Greece (b. 1898)
1988 – Zlatko Grgić, Croatian-Canadian animator, director, and screenwriter (b. 1931)
1989 – Graham Chapman, English actor and screenwriter (b. 1941)
1990 – Mārtiņš Zīverts, Latvian playwright (b. 1903) 
1992 – Denny Hulme, New Zealand race car driver (b. 1936)
1994 – Danny Gatton, American guitarist (b. 1945)
1997 – Otto Ernst Remer, German general (b. 1912)
  1997   – Gunpei Yokoi, Japanese game designer, created Game Boy (b. 1941)
1998 – S. Arasaratnam, Sri Lankan historian and academic (b. 1930)
1999 – Bernard Buffet, French painter and illustrator (b. 1928)
  1999   – Art Farmer, American trumpet player and composer (b. 1928)
2000 – Yu Kuo-hwa, Chinese politician, 32nd Premier of the Republic of China (b. 1914)
  2000   – Michael Smith, English-Canadian biochemist and geneticist, Nobel Prize laureate (b. 1932)
2001 – Blaise Alexander, American race car driver (b. 1976)
  2001   – John Collins, American guitarist (b. 1913)
  2001   – Ahron Soloveichik, Russian rabbi and scholar (b. 1917)
2002 – André Delvaux, Belgian-Spanish director and screenwriter (b. 1926)
2003 – Sid McMath, American lawyer and politician, 34th Governor of Arkansas (b. 1912)
2004 – Gordon Cooper, American colonel, engineer, and astronaut (b. 1927)
2005 – Stanley K. Hathaway, American lawyer and politician, 40th United States Secretary of the Interior (b. 1924)
2007 – Qassem Al-Nasser, Jordanian general (b. 1925)
2009 – Gerhard Kaufhold, German footballer (b. 1928)
  2009   – Günther Rall, German general and pilot (b. 1918)
2010 – Norman Wisdom, English actor, comedian, and singer-songwriter (b. 1915)
2011 – Doris Belack, American actress (b. 1926)
2012 – David Atkinson, Canadian actor and singer (b. 1921)
  2012   – Stan Mudenge, Zimbabwean historian and politician, Zimbabwean Minister of Foreign Affairs (b. 1941)
  2012   – Tom Stannage, Australian footballer, historian, and academic (b. 1944)
2013 – John Cloudsley-Thompson, Pakistani-English commander (b. 1921)
  2013   – Ulric Cross, Trinidadian navigator, judge, and diplomat (b. 1917)
  2013   – Akira Miyoshi, Japanese composer (b. 1933)
  2013   – Diana Nasution, Indonesian singer (b. 1958)
  2013   – Võ Nguyên Giáp, Vietnamese general and politician, 3rd Minister of Defence for Vietnam (b. 1911)
  2013   – Nicholas Oresko, American sergeant, Medal of Honor recipient (b. 1917)
2014 – Konrad Boehmer, German-Dutch composer and educator (b. 1941)
  2014   – Hugo Carvana, Brazilian actor, director, producer, and screenwriter (b. 1937)
  2014   – Fyodor Cherenkov, Russian footballer and manager (b. 1959)
  2014   – Jean-Claude Duvalier, Haitian politician, 41st President of Haiti (b. 1951)
2015 – Dave Pike, American vibraphone player and songwriter (b. 1938)
  2015   – Edida Nageswara Rao, Indian director and producer (b. 1934)
  2015   – Neal Walk, American basketball player (b. 1948)
2020 – Clark Middleton, American actor (b. 1957)
  2020   – Kenzō Takada, Japanese-French fashion designer (b. 1939)
2022 – Loretta Lynn, American singer-songwriter and musician (b. 1932)

Holidays and observances
Christian feast day:
Amun
Francis of Assisi
Petronius of Bologna
October 4 (Eastern Orthodox liturgics)
Cinnamon Roll Day  (Sweden and Finland)
Day of Peace and Reconciliation (Mozambique)
Independence Day, celebrates the independence of Lesotho from the United Kingdom in 1966.
The beginning of World Space Week (International)
World Animal Day

References

External links

 
 
 

Days of the year
October